The Grammy Award for Best Traditional R&B Performance is an accolade presented at the Grammy Awards, a ceremony that was established in 1958 and originally named the Gramophone Awards, to performers of quality traditional R&B vocal performances. The award was first given in 1999; until 2003, only albums were nominated, now just singles or tracks are. Honors in several categories are presented at the ceremony annually by the National Academy of Recording Arts and Sciences of the United States to "honor artistic achievement, technical proficiency and overall excellence in the recording industry, without regard to album sales or chart position."

Between 1999 and 2002, this accolade was originally known as Best Traditional R&B Vocal Album. It was renamed in 2003 as  Best Traditional R&B Vocal Performance. Since 2012, the category has been known as Best Traditional R&B Performance.

The award goes to the artist. The producer, engineer and songwriter can apply for a Winners Certificate.

Lalah Hathaway and Beyoncé have the most wins (3) in this category. Anthony Hamilton has the most nominations (5) in this category.

Recipients

1990s

2000s

2010s

2020s

 Each year is linked to the article about the Grammy Awards held that year.

See also 

 List of Grammy Award categories
 List of R&B musicians

References 

 General
 

 Specific

External links 
 Official site of the Grammy Awards

Grammy Award for Best Traditional R&B Vocal Performance